Zinc finger protein 57 homolog (ZFP57), also known as zinc finger protein 698 (ZNF698), is a protein that in humans is encoded by the ZFP57 gene.

Function 
The protein encoded by this gene is a zinc finger protein containing a KRAB domain. Studies in mouse suggest that this protein may function as a transcriptional repressor.

Clinical significance 

Mutations in the ZFP57 gene may be associated with transient neonatal diabetes mellitus.

References

Further reading